Count Raffaele Ulisse Barbolani (Chieti, April 30, 1818 – Palena, October 17, 1900) was an Italian diplomat and journalist, Secretary General of the Ministry of Foreign Affairs (1867–1869) and passionate about Japanese Culture.

Biography

Barbolani diplomat of the Kingdom of the Two Sicilies and liberal journalist 
Descending from a branch of the Tuscan family  who moved to Abruzzo, Raffaele Ulisse Barbolani entered the diplomacy of Kingdom of the Two Sicilies in 1847; at the same time he collaborates for foreign policy news with Il Nazionale , a newspaper founded in February 1848 by Silvio Spaventa. The newspaper represented a point of reference for the liberal bourgeoisie but was also influential among conservatives and pro-Bourbonists.

The diplomatic career for the Kingdom of Italy 
At the fall of the Kingdom of the Two Sicilies (1860), Barbolani, a charge d'affaires in Rio de Janeiro, was placed at the disposal of the Garibaldi dictatorial government. Later, he is admitted into the diplomacy of Kingdom of Italy and takes up service in Turin, at Ministry of Foreign Affairs. In 1863 he is in charge of affairs in Montevideo. From 1867 to 1869 Ulisse Barbolani was appointed  by the prime minister and interim minister Luigi Federico Menabrea; when the third Menabrea Cabinet took office, however, he was alternated in the office by Alberto Blanc. Subsequently Barbolani was extraordinary envoy and plenipotentiary minister to Constantinople and  Petersburg (1870–1876). In 1875, in Colledimacine - where his family owns an Ancient palace – marries Sofia Eugenia Giustina Teti. The year before, at his own expense, he had the bell tower of the Church of San Rocco built there, as shown in the appropriate plaque.

Barbolani in Japan 
In 1877, Raffaele Ulisse Barbolani was sent as plenipotentiary minister to Tokyo, where he remained for about four years. Barbolani manages with intelligence and skill the visit of the prince Thomas to the emperor Meiji, winning the trust of the Japanese government and the sympathy of the  imperial court , so much so that, a few years later, a Japanese minister declared that "in classifying the European powers in relation to the sympathy they enjoy in Japan, Italy occupied the first place, Russia the second and Germany the third". Ulysses Barbolani is responsible for the preservation of a precious collection of photographs of ancient Japan, discovered a few years ago in Pescara and published by the Japanese publishing house Heibonsha  平凡 社. The collection, found among the diplomat's papers, is presented as a complete photographic record of the whole country. The album collects 1268 photographs, distributed throughout Japan and perfectly ordered by regions, cities and neighborhoods, with the indication written in Japanese and French, for each photograph. The images have effectively returned to a period in which the greatest changes that the  Japanese history had known and which, otherwise, would have been without documentation were taking place. Raffaele Ulisse Barbolani ended his diplomatic career as plenipotentiary minister in Munich.

See also 
 Ministry of Foreign Affairs (Italy)
 Foreign relations of Italy

References

Bibliography 

 Marisa Di Russo, Raffaele Ulisse Barbolani. Un diplomatico abruzzese nel Giappone di fine Ottocento, in: Oggi e Domani, CCLXX, 1999, 10, p. 11.

1818 births
1900 deaths
Ambassadors of Italy to Argentina
Ambassadors of Italy to China
Ambassadors of Italy to the Ottoman Empire
Ambassadors of Italy to Japan
Ambassadors of Italy to Russia
19th-century Italian diplomats